Haizlip is a surname. Notable people with the surname include:

Ellis Haizlip (1929–1991), American television and theatrical producer and broadcaster 
Jay Haizlip, American skateboarder
Shirlee Taylor Haizlip (born 1937), American author
Mae Haizlip, American aviator
Jim Haizlip, American aviator who set transcontinental airspeed record in 1932